Mercedes Helnwein (born 1979) is an artist, writer and filmmaker. She was born in Vienna, Austria.

Biography
Mercedes Helnwein was born in Vienna, Austria. Her father is Austro-Irish artist Gottfried Helnwein. She and her brothers, Cyril, Ali, and Wolfgang Amadeus, often modeled for their father's work as children, whose works often included nightmarish depictions of war and exploitation.

As children, Mercedes and her siblings were given the freedom to express themselves, and she developed a style distinctively hers. 

She says , "Secrets of suburbia, the surface fakeness, have always been interesting to me"   

Helnwein creates large-scale drawings, most of which are done with black pencil, colored pencils, or pastels.

Helnwein's art debuted in 2003, with her first group exhibition hosted in Downtown Los Angeles by actor Jason Lee.

Mercedes Helnwein contributed art to the 2006 Beck album, The Information.

In 2010, Damien Hirst acquired the entire work of Helnwein's "Whistling Past the Graveyard" show in London.

In 2004, her travelogue, "Devil Got Religion," covered the 15-day road trip with Alex Prager and Beth Riesgraf for their "America Motel" installation.

Her debut novel, The Potential Hazards of Hester Day, was released in February 2008 by Simon & Schuster.

Selected reviews
 The Helnwein Siblings' Artful Life in LA, by Jessica Gelt, Los Angeles Times, Oct 16, 2011
 Making Cindy Sherman Proud, by Rachel Wolff, New York Magazine, July 3, 2007

References

External links
 

1979 births
Living people
Austrian women writers
Austrian Scientologists
Writers from Vienna
Feminist artists
Austrian video artists
21st-century Austrian painters
21st-century Austrian women artists